DXET (106.7 FM), on-air as 106.7 Radyo Digoseño, is a radio station owned by Interactive Broadcast Media and operated by the City Government of Digos. Its studios are located along Magsaysay St., Digos.

History

The station was launched on July 8, 1993, as Kool 106. It initially carried a hot adult contemporary format, but shifted to a mainstream Top 40 format in 1995. In September 2004, it rebranded as Dream FM and switched to a smooth jazz format.

After PLDT's media subsidiary MediaQuest Holdings, Inc. acquired TV5 and its affiliate ABC television stations from the consortium led by the Cojuangco group and Malaysia-based broadcaster Media Prima Berhad in March 2010, Dream FM and its regional stations were spun off to become Dream FM Network, led by former ABC stockholder Anton Lagdameo. The ownership of the stations were transferred to Interactive Broadcast Media, after Cojuangco acquired a non-controlling share of the company.

On June 30, 2011, all of its Dream FM stations ceased operations.

In February 2022, the Digos city government took over the station's operations and launched it as Radyo Digoseño.

References

Radio stations in Davao del Sur
Radio stations established in 1993
Defunct radio stations in the Philippines